Ecovative Design LLC is a materials company headquartered in Green Island, New York, that provides sustainable alternatives to plastics and polystyrene foams for packaging, building materials and other applications by using mushroom technology.

History
Ecovative was developed from a university project of founders Eben Bayer and Gavin McIntyre. In their Inventor's Studio course at Rensselaer Polytechnic Institute taught by Burt Swersey, Eben and Gavin developed and then patented a method of growing a mushroom-based insulation, initially called Greensulate before founding Ecovative Design in 2007. In 2007 they were awarded $16,000 from the National Collegiate Inventors and Innovators Alliance.

Since 2008, when they were awarded $700,000 first place in the Picnic Green Challenge the company has developed and commercialized production of a protective packaging called EcoCradle that is now used by Dell, Puma SE, and Steelcase. In 2010 they were awarded $180,000 from the National Science Foundation and in 2011 the company received investment from 3M New Ventures, The DOEN Foundation, and Rensselaer Polytechnic Institute allowing them to double their current staff of 25.

In spring 2012, Ecovative Design opened a new production facility and announced a partnership with Sealed Air to expand production of the packaging materials. In 2014 their material was used in a brick form in 'Hy-Fi', a  tower displayed in New York by the Museum of Modern Art and they started selling 'grow-it-yourself' kits.

In November 2019, the company announced a $10M investment to support their new Mycelium Foundry.

In February 2020, IKEA committed to using Ecovative technology for packaging, replacing polystyrene.

In April 2021, Ecovative Design received a $60M investment to develop new applications for their technology and scale up manufacturing.

Mushroom materials

Mushroom materials are a novel class of renewable bio-material grown from fungal mycelium and low-value non-food agricultural materials using a patented process developed by Ecovative Design. After being left to grow in a former in a dark place for about five days during which time the fungal mycelial network binds the mixture, the resulting light robust organic compostable material can be used within many products, including building materials, thermal insulation panels and protective packaging.

The process uses an agricultural waste product such as cotton hulls, cleaning the material, heating it up, inoculating it to create growth of the fungal mycelium, growing the material for period of about five days, and finally heating it to make the fungus inert.
During growth, the material's shape can be molded into various products including protective packaging, building products, apparel, car bumpers, or surfboards. 
The environmental footprint of the products is minimized through the use of agricultural waste, reliance on natural and non-controlled growth environments, and home compostable final products. The founders' intention is that this technology should replace polystyrene and other petroleum-based products that take many years to decompose, or never do so.

Protective packaging
A renewable and compostable replacement for polystyrene packaging, that is also referred to as 'EcoCradle.

Structural biocomposites
A natural and renewable replacement for engineered wood, formed from compressed mushroom material and requiring no numerical control. Architect David Benjamin of The Living, working with Evovative Design and Arup, built 'Hy-Fi', a temporary  external exhibit at the Museum of Modern Art in New York City in 2014.

Thermal insulation
An insulation product is under development. Trials of 'Greensulate', a former product, were conducted at a Vermont school gym in May 2009. The product was later dropped when the company switched focus to the manufacture of protective packaging.

Other uses

Ecovative offer a 'Grow-it-yourself' kit allowing people to create mushroom materials themselves, used to create products including lamp shades.

Working with the University of Aachen, Dutch designer Eric Klarenbeek used 3D printing technology to gown a chair without using plastic, metal or wood.

Media
Popular Science featured the composite insulation in its 2009 Invention Awards. A season six episode of CSI: New York, also featured the insulation as lab technicians tested the materials' flame resistant properties after finding particles on a victim's clothing.  Packaging World magazine featured Ecovative on its July 2011 cover, suggesting that the company is poised to "be a game changer in various industries."
The World Economic Forum also recognized Ecovative as a Technology Pioneer in 2011.  Additionally, the founders were featured on the PBS show, Biz Kid$, in episode 209, "The Green Economy & You."

Support

The development of the material and processes has been supported by the Picnic Green Challenge, the Environmental Protection Agency, National Collegiate Inventors and Innovators Alliance (NCIIA), ASME, the National Science Foundation, NYSERDA, 3M New Ventures, The DOEN Foundation, Rensselaer Polytechnic Institute and a license agreement with Sealed Air. 
In addition to an array of awards, Ecovative's materials have been extensively highlighted in Material ConneXion libraries around the world.

References

External links

 Ecovative's homepage

Biomaterials
Manufacturing companies based in New York (state)
Companies based in Albany County, New York

See also
 Mycobond